Tanglish is the mixing or code-switching of the Tamil and English languages.

The name is a portmanteau of the names of the two languages and has been variously composed. The earliest form is Tamilish (dating from 1972), then Tinglish (1974), Tamglish (1991), Tamlish (1993), Thanglish (1997), and Tanglish (1999).

Distribution

Tamil Nadu
The use of Tanglish has been common in Chennai, possibly due in part to the use of English in education. Also, the influx to the city of speakers of other languages (such as Telugu, Gujarati, and Kannada) has increased the importance of English as the language that people have in common.  In The Hindu in 2010, a student in Chennai told of the widespread use of Tanglish by teenagers in her city. She said Tanglish was "something almost every teenager in Chennai uses", but noted that her mother said Tanglish was "murdering the [Tamil] language". That same year, a Tamil teacher in a matriculation school in Chennai reported that few of her students had a large enough Tamil vocabulary to be able to speak Tamil without including some words of English.

Tanglish is increasingly used in advertising aimed at consumers in Tamil Nadu, particularly for promotion of international products. For example, Pepsi has mixed English with Tamil in its slogan "ullam kekkuthae more". In 2004, The Hindu commented on a mobile phone advertising campaign in Chennai that used slogans that combined Tamil and English, such as "Konjam Samaiyal... Konjam Serial", "Konjam Advice... Konjam Udaans", and "Konjam Kadhal... Konjam Modhal." It also is common for advertising to use the Tamil language rendered in the English alphabet, a trend that leads to concern that people are losing the ability to read Tamil script.

The Tanglish lyrics of the film song "Why This Kolaveri Di", which went viral on Internet social networking sites in November 2011, have been identified as a factor in the song's popularity.

Tamil diasporas
Use of Tanglish has been reported among Tamil-speaking immigrant populations in Malaysia and Canada, particularly by young people.  Singaporean rapper Yung Raja is known for his extensive use of Tanglish in his lyrics.

Characteristics
A study of code switching in everyday speech in Tamil Nadu found that English words are commonly inserted into sentences that otherwise follow Tamil syntax.

A characteristic of Tanglish or Tamil-English code-switching is the addition of Tamil affixes to English words. The sound "u" is added at the end of an English noun to create a Tamil noun form, as in "soundu" and the words "girl-u heart-u black-u" in the lyrics of "Why This Kolaveri Di". English nouns often are combined with Tamil case markers, as in "journeyai" (accusative case), "driverkku" (dative case, used to mean "for the driver"), and "teacheroṭa" (of the teacher, genitive case). Verbs and some nouns from the English language are converted to Tamil verb forms by adding Tamil verbalizers that indicate verb tense. For example, the Tamil verb "paṇṇu" is added to the English verb "drive", resulting in "drive paṇṇu", used to mean "do the driving". Another pattern that has been noted by speakers or observers of Tanglish is the addition of the syllable "fy" at the end of a Tamil word (e.g., maattify, Kalaachify).

See also

 Indian English
 Regional differences and dialects in Indian English
 Madras Bashai, a related, but distinct, language variant, a slang form of Tamil used in Chennai that is a blend of Tamil with Indian English, Telugu and Hindustani

References

Macaronic forms of English
Tamil language